Slavica Rinčić (born 17 May 1966) is a Croatian handball player. She competed in the women's tournament at the 1988 Summer Olympics.

References

External links
 

1966 births
Living people
Croatian female handball players
Olympic handball players of Yugoslavia
Handball players at the 1988 Summer Olympics
Sportspeople from Split, Croatia